Heroes of Tobruk is a young adult historical novel written by David Mulligan. It is set in Italian North Africa during World War II and was first published by Scholastic in 2008.

Plot summary
The story follows Peter Fullerton and Tony Cantonelli's teen life as they illegally join the Australian army and are shipped off to the Siege of Tobruk. They soon become men as they experience heartfelt moments and feel much hurt throughout the story.

Blurb
There's always a moment of almost uncontrollable fear and terror when a patrol comes back and the face you're looking for isn't there.

It is 1940, and sixteen-year-old Peter Fullerton and his best mate Tony Cantonelli give false names and lie about their age to enlist in the army. Heroes Of Tobruk follows Peter and Tony from the outbreak of war, through military training and the Siege of Tobruk.

A moving story about the horror of war and the courage of ordinary soldiers.

References

2008 Australian novels
Australian young adult novels
Novels set during World War II
Novels set in Libya
Fiction set in 1940